Ainiktozoon loganense is an enigmatic fossil organism from the Silurian of Scotland. Originally described as an early chordate, recent studies suggest that it was in fact an arthropod, more precisely a thylacocephalan crustacean.

A. loganense is known from a number of specimens from Silurian rocks (Ludlow series) at Lesmahagow in Scotland.

Etymology

References

External links
 (see the files whose names start "ain")

Thylacocephala
Prehistoric crustacean genera
Silurian crustaceans
Silurian animals of Europe
Fossil taxa described in 1937